Argentina competed in the 2019 Parapan American Games in Lima, Peru. This was the country's largest delegation to the Parapan American Games in its history. In total athletes representing Argentina won 17 gold medals, 28 silver medals, 37 bronze medals and finished 5th in the medal table.

Medalists

Athletics

Badminton

Boccia

Cycling

Football 5-a-side

Football 7-a-side

Goalball

Judo

Powerlifting

Shooting

Swimming

Table tennis

Men

Women

Taekwondo

Wheelchair basketball

Wheelchair rugby

Team roster
The mixed team was composed of 11 male athletes.
 Juan Herrera
 Jose Arhancet
 Fernando Cañumil
 Matías Cardozo (captain)
 Emanuel Castro
 Mariana Santoro
 Lautaro Fernandez
 Mariano Gaastaldi
 Marcelo Ullua
 Lucas Camussi
 Juan Bandini
 Emmanuel Leguizamon (Head coach)
 Andres Mariano Hurtado (Assistant coach)

Results

Wheelchair tennis

At the time Gustavo Fernandez was a reigning champion in the men's singles and he won a medal in both the men's singles event and men's doubles event.

See also
Argentina at the 2019 Pan American Games
Argentina at the 2020 Summer Paralympics

References

2019 in Argentine sport
Nations at the 2019 Parapan American Games